Bashtala (Baştañul) is a rural locality (a village) in Ust-Koksinsky District, the Altai Republic, Russia. The population was 454 as of 2016. There are 15 streets.

Geography 
Bashtala is located 4 km northeast of Ust-Koksa (the district's administrative centre) by road. Ust-Koksa is the nearest rural locality.

References 

Rural localities in Ust-Koksinsky District